West Virginia Route 230 is a north–south state highway located entirely within Jefferson County in the U.S. state of West Virginia. The southern terminus of the route is at U.S. Route 340 west of Bolivar. The northern terminus of the route is at West Virginia Route 45 and West Virginia Route 480 in Shepherdstown.

South of CR 17, WV 230 was formerly part of County Route 23.

Major intersections

References

230
Transportation in Jefferson County, West Virginia